Deanna Lund (May 30, 1937 – June 22, 2018) was an American film and television actress best known for her role in the Irwin Allen television series Land of the Giants, in which she played the character of Valerie Ames Scott.

Early years
Lund was the daughter of attorney Arthur Lund, who at one time served in the legislature of Illinois. The family moved to Daytona Beach, Florida, when she was eight. She dropped out of Rollins College, where she was studying drama, to get married. Before becoming an actress, she attended modeling school and worked as a secretary. Later, she did commercials on television and became a weather person at a television station.

Career
Lund's early career included minor roles in the 1960s spy film parodies Dr. Goldfoot and the Bikini Machine (1965) and Dimension 5 (1966), as well as the horror film Sting of Death (1965), the beach film Out of Sight (1966), and the western Johnny Tiger (1966). She appeared as a lesbian stripper in the 1967 Frank Sinatra movie Tony Rome, but Lund was so embarrassed by the role that she had her name removed from the credits. Her performance was favorably received and led to a starring role in Irwin Allen's television series Land of the Giants. While waiting for filming to start, Lund was offered the part of Rosemary's friend Terry Gionoffrio in Rosemary's Baby but had to decline when, despite Roman Polanski's assurances, Allen did not believe she would be finished in time.

Valerie in Giantland, a novella written by Lund, is based on the Land of the Giants series, and set ten years later; written from the point of view of Lund's character, Valerie Ames. In 1976, she appeared on the drama General Hospital as Peggy Lowell, the secretary and mistress of Cameron Faulkner, who was played by Lund's husband Don Matheson. Her later films included the Jerry Lewis comedy Hardly Working (1980), Stick (1985) starring Burt Reynolds, and horror movies such as the Christmas horror film Elves (1989), Witch Story (1989), and the comedy Transylvania Twist (1989).

Personal life
Lund dropped out of college to marry her high school sweetheart. They had two children but  divorced after four years. After Land of the Giants was cancelled, she married co-star Don Matheson, but they were divorced in the late 1970s. Their daughter, Michele Matheson, is also an actress. Lund is an alumna of Rollins College in Winter Park, Florida.

In 1995, she dated Larry King. The couple were engaged five weeks after they met but the relationship ended before they could be married.

Lund died on June 22, 2018 at her home in Century City, California of pancreatic cancer, aged 81.

Filmography

References

External links
 
 
 Deanna Lund Official Website
 Deanna Lund at Sixties Cinema

1937 births
2018 deaths
American people of Swedish descent
American film actresses
American television actresses
Actresses from Illinois
Rollins College alumni
Actors from Oak Park, Illinois
Deaths from pancreatic cancer
Deaths from cancer in California
21st-century American women